"Frame of Mind" is the 147th episode of the American science fiction television series Star Trek: The Next Generation. The 21st episode of the sixth season debuted on May 3, 1993, on television. The story was written by Brannon Braga and directed by James L. Conway, and it is focused on some experiences of First Officer Riker.

Set in the 24th century, the series follows the adventures of the Starfleet crew of the Federation starship Enterprise-D. In this episode, Commander Riker switches between mental realities: performing in one of Dr. Crusher's plays, preparing for an undercover away mission and being an inmate in an alien asylum for the criminally insane, charged with murder. The way the show is presented makes it difficult to tell what is real, and what is not, in Riker's mind.

The episode first aired in broadcast syndication the week of May 1, 1993.

Plot
Prior to taking a covert mission, Riker is rehearsing for a theater play "Frame of Mind" for the Enterprise. The play involves Riker's character confined to a mental asylum, and involves a soliloquy regarding the nature of being sane. During practice for the mission, he is accidentally injured by Lt. Worf on the side of his head, and while Dr. Crusher heals the wound, Riker still experiences some pain there. Riker performs the play for the crew, and receives a standing ovation, except for one officer in the center of the crowd who frowns at the performance. Riker takes a bow, but when he straightens, he finds the audience gone, himself trapped in a cell similar to the set for the play. An alien humanoid doctor iterates "I see we still have much work to do", a line from the play, before locking Riker in the cell.

Later, Riker is taken to the asylum cafeteria, reminded that he is there because he killed a man. Riker becomes agitated by this news, and the doctors inject him with more drugs, knocking him out. Riker finds himself back on the Enterprise, but this is a figment of his imagination: after seeing one of the alien doctors several times, he flees to his quarters only to find himself back in the asylum cell. The doctors, attempting to quench Riker's hallucinations about the Enterprise, use a procedure that produces holographic projections of the Enterprise that Riker is forced to reject to gain the confidence of his doctor.

The next day while in the cafeteria, Riker refuses to talk with what he believes is a hallucination of Dr. Crusher, warning him that they are planning on rescuing him. That night, Worf and Data appear and free Riker, overwhelming the guards and returning him to the Enterprise. Riker, still defiant that the Enterprise is not real, complains of pain in his head, the same wound from before. Dr. Crusher cures it but it returns immediately, leading Riker to believe that this is another hallucination. He proves this to himself by firing a phaser at himself; the scene shatters, and he finds himself back in the asylum cell under the watchful eye of the doctors. He realizes he is still holding a phaser, though the doctors claim that it is a knife. When the head pain strikes again, Riker dismisses this scene as reality, and sets the phaser to overload, which would take half the facility with it. When it goes off, he finds himself on the stage of his play, the crowd giving a standing ovation. Riker refuses to accept this as real, and pounds on the wall of the set, shattering that reality.

Riker recovers consciousness to find himself on an operating table, a device inserted into his head where he has been experiencing pain. Riker frees himself from the table, renders an alien doctor unconscious, and recovers his communication badge on a nearby table, requesting an immediate beam-out. Riker shortly finds himself back safely aboard the Enterprise. As Dr. Crusher tends to his wounds, he learns that he was captured on the covert mission he was on, and the aliens were scanning his brain to discover strategic information about the Federation. The strange experiences he saw were a result of his own subconscious fighting against the probe. After recovering, Riker returns to the set of the play one last time to dismantle it.

Production
The story was written by Brannon Braga and directed by James L. Conway, and it is focused on some experiences of First Officer Riker. Braga's initial idea for the story was: "What if Riker wakes up in an insane asylum?" Conway had previously directed TNG episodes "Justice" and "The Neutral Zone" in season one.

The show guest stars Susanna Thompson as Jaya, her second appearance on The Next Generation. Thompson would later return in the Deep Space Nine episode "Rejoined", and as the Borg Queen in several episodes of  Star Trek: Voyager. David Selburg, Andrew Prine and Gary Werntz also guest star.

Reception
In 2001, The A.V. Club rated this episode an "A−" and said it was actor Jonathan Frakes' best performance so far in the series.

In 2012, Keith DeCandido of Tor.com gave the episode a rating of 9 out of 10.

In 2016, The Hollywood Reporter rated "Frame of Mind" the 68th best episode of all Star Trek episodes and the 16th best episode of Star Trek: The Next Generation, and again in May 2019 they ranked it as one of the top 25 episodes of this show, describing it as a "dark and ambitious" episode with a script that played with the audience's sense of reality.

Wired ranked "Frame of Mind" as one of the best episodes of Star Trek: The Next Generation in a 2012 review, and quoted writer Ronald D. Moore: "I thought it was interesting how 'Frame of Mind' used a play as a bridge to drive Riker between reality and madness," Moore said.

In 2017, Heroes & Icons listed this episode as one of 18 Star Trek episodes featuring scary or eerie content.

In 2017, Den of Geek ranked this episode as one of the top 25 "must watch" episodes of Star Trek: The Next Generation.

In 2018, The Gamer ranked this as the 20th creepiest episode of all Star Trek, noting how the audience is not sure what is real and calling it "uncomfortable".

In 2019, The Hollywood Reporter listed this among the 25 best episodes of Star Trek: The Next Generation.

In 2020, Den of Geek ranked "Frame of Mind" as the fourth most scary episode of all Star Trek franchise television episodes.

In 2021, Screen Rant ranked it the second scariest episode of all Star Trek franchise episodes. They praised actor Jonathan Frakes performance and a high-quality story.

Releases 
The episode was released as part of the Star Trek: The Next Generation season six DVD box set in the United States on December 3, 2002.  A remastered HD version was released on Blu-ray on June 24, 2014.

On November 3, 1999, this was released on LaserDisc in the United States, paired with "Suspicions". The two episodes together had a runtime of 93 minutes, and it had a Dolby Surround audio track.

See also
 The Big Goodbye (also has David Selburg cast)
TNG
 Night Terrors (March 18, 1991)
 Schisms (October 19, 1992)
 Chain of Command, Part I & Part II (December 14, 1992 & December 21, 1992)
 Sub Rosa (January 31, 1994)
 Genesis (March 21, 1994)
 Voyager
 Projections (September 11, 1995), this Voyager episode also plays with the character's sense of reality
 Other
 Total Recall (1990 film) (A construction worker's memory implant goes awry)

References

External links
 

Star Trek: The Next Generation (season 6) episodes
1993 American television episodes
Television episodes written by Brannon Braga
Television episodes directed by James L. Conway
Television episodes set in psychiatric hospitals